The 2021–22 Liga TDP season is the fourth-tier football league of Mexico. The tournament began on 9 September 2021 and finished on 3 June 2022.

Competition format 
The Tercera División (Third Division) is divided into 17 groups. For the 2009–2010 season, the format of the tournament has been reorganized to a home and away format, which all teams will play in their respective group. The 17 groups consist of teams which are eligible to play in the liguilla de ascenso for three promotion spots, teams who are affiliated with teams in the Liga MX, Liga de Expansión MX and Liga Premier and development teams, which are not eligible for promotion but will play that who the better team in a sixteen team filial playoff tournament for the entire season.

The league format allows participating franchises to rent their place to another team, so some clubs compete with a different name than the one registered with the FMF.

For the 2021–22 season there will be three promotions to the Liga Premier. Two to Serie A and one to Serie B.

Group 1 
Group with 12 teams from Campeche, Quintana Roo, Tabasco and Yucatán.  NOTE: Puerto Aventuras (registered as Tulum) participated in the first half of the season, but withdrew from the league in January 2022 due to financial problems.

Teams

League table

Group 2
Group with 11 teams from Chiapas and Oaxaca.

Teams

League table

Group 3
Group with 15 teams from Puebla, San Luis Potosí, Tlaxcala and Veracruz.

Teams

League table

Group 4
Group with 16 teams from Greater Mexico City.

Teams

League table

Group 5
Group with 15 teams from Greater Mexico City. NOTE: On October 28, 2021, Mayas Soccer F.C. was expelled from the League for not fulfilling its obligations as an affiliate.

Teams

League table

Group 6
Group with 12 teams from State of Mexico.

{{Location map+ |Mexico State of Mexico |width=500|float=right |caption=Location of teams in the 2021–22 Liga TDP Group 6 |places=

Teams

League table

Group 7
Group with 13 teams from Guerrero, Mexico City Morelos and State of Mexico.

Teams

League table

Group 8
Group with 16 teams from Hidalgo, Mexico City and State of Mexico.

Teams

League table

Group 9
Group with 15 teams from Guanajuato and Querétaro.

{{Location map+ |Mexico Querétaro |width=450|float=right |caption=Location of teams in the 2021–22 Liga TDP Group 9 (Querétaro)|places=

Teams

League table

Group 10
Group with 10 teams from Guanajuato and Michoacán. NOTE: Deportivo Yurécuaro was announced as a member of the group, however on September 29, 2021, the club withdrew from the league voluntarily.

Teams

League table

Group 11
Group with 10 teams from Aguascalientes, Durango, Guanajuato, Jalisco and Zacatecas. NOTE: Atlético ECCA was announced as a team member of the group, however on September 29, 2021, it was expelled from the League for not fulfilling its obligations as an affiliate.

Teams
{{Location map+ |Mexico Guanajuato |width=300|float=right |caption=Location of teams in the 2021–22 Liga TDP Group 11 (Guanajuato and Jalisco)|places=

League table

Group 12
Group with 12 teams from Jalisco.

Teams
{{Location map+ |Mexico Jalisco |width=500|float=right |caption=Location of teams in the 2021–22 Liga TDP Group 12 |places=

League table

Group 13
Group with 11 teams from Jalisco.

Teams
{{Location map+ |Mexico Jalisco |width=500|float=right |caption=Location of teams in the 2021–22 Liga TDP Group 13 |places=

League table

Group 14
Group with 12 teams from Jalisco, Nayarit and Sinaloa. NOTE: Camaroneros de Escuinapa participated in the first half of the season, but withdrew from the league in February 2022 due to unknown reasons.

Teams

League table

Group 15
Group with 16 teams from Coahuila, Nuevo León, San Luis Potosí and Tamaulipas. NOTE: Bravos de Nuevo Laredo participated in the first half of the season, but withdrew from the league in January 2022 due to financial problems.

Teams
{{Location map+ |Mexico Nuevo León |width=250|float=right |caption=Location of teams in the 2021–22 Liga TDP Group 15 (Nuevo León)|places=

League table

Group 16
Group with 11 teams from Baja California, Chihuahua and Sonora.

Teams

League table

Group 17
Group with 4 teams from Baja California.

Teams

League table

Promotion Play–offs
The Promotion Play–offs will consist of seven phases. Classify 64 teams, the number varies according to the number of teams in each group, being between three and eight clubs per group. The country will be divided into two zones: South Zone (Groups 1 to 8) and North Zone (Groups 9 to 17). Eliminations will be held according to the average obtained by each team, being ordered from best to worst by their percentage throughout the season.

As of 2020–21 season, the names of the knockout stages were modified as follows: Round of 32, Round of 16, Quarter-finals, Semifinals, Zone Final and Final, this as a consequence of the division of the country into two zones, for so the teams only face clubs from the same region until the final series.

Round of 32
The first legs were played on 27 and 28 April, and the second legs were played on 30 April and 1 May 2022.

South Zone

North Zone

Round of 16
The first legs were played on 4 and 5 May, and the second legs will be played on 7 and 8 May 2022.

South Zone

North Zone

Final stage

Zone Quarter–finals
The first legs were played on 11 and 12 May, and the second legs were played on 14 and 15 May 2022.

First leg

Second leg

Zone Semi–finals
The first legs were played on 18 May, and the second legs were played on 21 May 2022.

First leg

Second leg

Zone Finals
The first legs will be played on 25 and 26 May, and the second legs will be played on 28 and 29 May 2022.

First leg

Second leg

National runner–ups play–off
The two losing clubs in the zone finals played a game to win a place in the Liga Premier – Serie B. The match was played on 1 June 2022. 

|}

National Final
The two winning clubs from the zone finals played a match to determine the league champion. The match was played on 3 June 2022 in a neutral stadium.

|}

Reserve and Development Teams 
Each season a table is created among those teams that don't have the right to promote, because they are considered as reserve teams for teams that play in Liga MX, Liga de Expansión and Liga Premier or are independent teams that have requested not to participate for the Promotion due to the fact that they are footballers development projects. The ranking order is determined through the "quotient", which is obtained by dividing the points obtained between the disputed matches, being ordered from highest to lowest.

Table 

Last updated: April 23, 2022 Source: Liga TDPP = Position; G = Games played; Pts = Points; Pts/G = Ratio of points to games played; GD = Goal difference

Play–offs

Round of 16
The first legs were played on 27 and 28 April, and the second legs were played on 30 April and 1 May 2022.

First leg

Second leg

Quarter-finals
The first legs were played on 4 and 5 May, and the second legs were played on 7 and 8 May 2022.

First leg

Second leg

Semi-finals
The first legs were played on 11 and 12 May, and the second legs were played on 14 and 15 May 2022.

First leg

Second leg

Final
The first leg were played on 19 May, and the second leg were played on 22 May 2022.

First leg

Second leg

Regular Season statistics

Top goalscorers 
Players sorted first by goals scored, then by last name.

Source:Liga TDP

References

External links 
 Official website of Liga TDP

1